SVG Capital was a leading British private equity and investment management business. Headquartered in London, it was listed on the London Stock Exchange.

History
The business was established in 1996 to acquire the private equity interests of Schroder Venture Group ('SVG'). It was first listed on the London Stock Exchange in the same year. 

In May 2008, SVG Capital announced the sale of £102 million of limited partnership interests in six private equity funds to Lexington Partners and SVG's collateralized fund obligation vehicle, SVG Diamond. 

In October 2016, the company agreed to sell its portfolio to HarbourVest for £807 million. In April 2017, the company announced that it would appoint a liquidator to manage the final distribution to shareholders. It was announced that SVG Capital would wind up on 29 June 2017 subject to a vote.

Investments
SVG Private Equity utilised collateralised fund obligation securitizations as part of its "Diamond" program, SVG Diamond (2004), SVG Diamond II (2006) and SVG Diamond III (2007) in order to raise capital for its private equity investments. 

SVG Private Equity had significant investments in private equity funds managed by Permira, which comprised over half of the firm's portfolio by value.

References

External links
 SVG Capital (archived company website)

Private equity firms of the United Kingdom
Defunct companies based in London
Investment management companies of the United Kingdom
Financial services companies established in 1996